James Talbot may refer to:

 James Talbot (priest) (1726–1790), last English Roman Catholic priest to be indicted for saying Mass
 James Talbot (Jacobite) (died 1691), Irish Jacobite
 James Talbot (bowls), Northern Irish lawn and indoor bowler
 James Talbot (rapist), Jesuit priest, teacher, coach, convicted of multiple rapes over a period of decades
 James A. Talbot (1879–1936), American businessman
 James Talbot (footballer), Irish footballer
 James Talbot, 4th Baron Talbot of Malahide (1805–1883), Anglo-Irish Liberal politician and amateur archaeologist
 James Theodore Talbot (1825–1862), officer in the United States Army
 James Talbot (rower), Australian Paralympic rower
 Jamie Talbot (born 1960), English jazz alto saxophonist
 Jamie Talbot (singer), Danish singer